Rashid bin Humaid Al Nuaimi II was the Ruler of Ajman, one of the Trucial States which today form the United Arab Emirates (UAE), from 1864–1891. His reign, while largely peaceful, saw the expansion of Wahhabi influence in the Trucial States.

Al Zorah fort 
Rashid was involved in the attempt to build a fortification at Al Zorah, on the coast of Ajman to the south of Hamriyah. Originally an uninhabited sandy island surrounded by mangrove swamps, in 1866 Khalid bin Sultan Al Qasimi of Sharjah, supported by Rashid bin Humaid and with the financial assistance of the Wahhabi agent, Turki bin Ahmed Al Sudairi, erected a fort there. As the development 'threatened the peace of the coast' according to the British, it was bombarded by the British ship HMS Highflyer and reduced to rubble.

Maritime Peace 
Ajman during Rashid's reign benefited from the period of relative peace and calm that followed the 1853 Perpetual Maritime Treaty, when both maritime trade and pearl fishing were able to both thrive and prosper. One of the rare major breaches of that treaty was to come in 1882, when a number of boats from Ajman were implicated in an attack on a Turkish-flagged boat, the 'Fath Al Karim', in the Red Sea. Not only had Ajman boats taken part in the raid, but the booty had been landed at Ajman. The British promptly despatched HMS Arab to Ajman and nine boats of Ajman's fleet were burnt as an example. A spat between Sharjah and Ajman boats broke out on the pearling banks in 1884, resolved this time by the British burning the Sharjah boat.

Although the seas were relatively calm, a number of events took place over Rashid's reign to disturb the peace on land. Principle among these was the constant problem of absconding debtors. Escaping a debt, a trader would flee from one emirate and take refuge in the next, leading to constant breakdowns in the relationships between the coastal communities. Rashid bin Humaid signed the 'Absconding Debtors Agreement' of 24 June 1879, which the British hoped would act as an effective instrument of extradition between the Rulers.

References 

1891 deaths
Sheikhs of the Emirate of Ajman
19th-century monarchs in the Middle East
History of the United Arab Emirates
19th-century Arabs